The Lebanese Office of the Minister of State for Administrative Reform was created in May and December 1994 in order to provide solutions and reform for a deficient post-civil war public administration.

The ministry consists of four units:
Technical Cooperation Unit
Advisory Group
Administration Department
Institutional Development Unit

Dr. Inaya Ezzeddine took over the office in Prime Minister Saad Hariri's government of 2016, replacing Nabil de Freige.

References

External links
 Office of the Minister of State for Administrative Reform

State for Administrative Reform